Longbranch Pennywhistle is an early-in-genre country rock album by Longbranch Pennywhistle, a duo featuring the then-little-known Glenn Frey and John David Souther. It also contains strains of folk rock. It was released in 1970; the duo split up shortly afterwards.

AllMusic's review of the album called it low-key and less commercial than the Eagles would be.

One of the album's songs, "Kite Woman", would resurface on Souther's 1972 debut solo album, John David Souther.

Track listing
Side one
"Jubilee Anne" (Souther)
"Run, Boy, Run" (Frey)
"Rebecca" (Frey)
"Lucky Love" (Souther)
"Kite Woman" (Souther)
"Bring Back Funky Women" (Souther, Frey)

Side Two
"Star-Spangled Bus" (Souther)
"Mister, Mister" (Souther)
"Don't Talk Now" (James Taylor)
"Never Have Enough" (Souther)

Personnel
John David Souther - guitar, vocals, arrangements
Glenn Frey - guitar, vocals, arrangements
James Burton - guitar
Ry Cooder - guitar
Buddy Emmons - steel guitar
Joe Osborn - bass
Doug Kershaw - fiddle
Larry Knechtel - piano
Jim Gordon - drums

Technical
Tom "Take-damn It" Thacker - producer
James Bowen - supervisor
Chuck Britz, Michael Lietz - engineer

References

External links
Glenn Frey Online
 All Music's bio on the band
Isthmus coverage of the album

1969 debut albums
Longbranch Pennywhistle albums